This is a list of music-related events in 1805.

Events
April 7 – Beethoven's Symphony No. 3, Eroica, has its public premiere at the Theater an der Wien in Vienna under his baton, marking the beginning of his middle period.
November 20 – Beethoven's only opera Fidelio in its original form (known retrospectively as Leonore) is premiered at the Theater an der Wien in Vienna.
Louis Spohr is appointed musical director to the court of Gotha.
Niccolò Paganini begins touring Europe.

Classical music
Ludwig van Beethoven 
Piano Concerto No.4, Op. 58
Leonora Overture No.2, Op. 72a
Erlkönig, WoO 131
ETA Hoffmann – Piano Sonatas
Franz Krommer – Concerto for Oboe in F Major, Op. 52
Louis Spohr
2 String Quartets, Op. 4
Violin Concerto No. 3, Op. 7
Joseph Wölfl
Piano Sonata in C minor, Op. 25
Three Piano Sonatas, Op. 33

Opera
Michele Carafa – Il Fantasma
Luigi Cherubini – Faniska
James Hook – The Soldier's Return

Births
January 7 – Philip Klitz, composer (d. 1854)
February 22 – Robert Reinick, lyricist and artist (died 1852)
March 5 – Théodore Labarre, harpist and composer (d. 1870)
March 17 – Manuel García, singer and music teacher (d. 1906)
May 14 – Johan Peter Emilius Hartmann, composer (d. 1900)
July 8 – Luigi Ricci, opera composer (d. 1859)
July 27 – Luigi Felice Rossi, composer and musicologist (d. 1863)
October 28 – John Thomson, composer (d. 1841)
November 1 – Alessandro Nini, composer (d. 1880)
November 14 – Fanny Mendelssohn, pianist and composer (d. 1847)

Deaths
January 23 – Wenzel Pichl, composer (b. 1741)
February 4 – Johann George Tromlitz, flautist (b. 1725)
April – Emerico Lobo de Mesquita, organist, conductor, composer and music teacher (b. 1746)
April 28 – Peter Pelham, harpsichordist, organist and composer (b. 1721)
May 9 – Friedrich Schiller, librettist and poet (born 1759)
May 10 – Johann Evangelist Haydn, tenor, brother of Joseph Haydn and Michael Haydn (b. 1743)
May 28 – Luigi Boccherini, composer (b. 1743)
August – Ann Griffiths, hymn-writer (b. 1776)
November – Hamoir, dancer and theatre director
December 18 – Gennaro Astarita, opera composer (b. c.1745)

References

 
19th century in music
Music by year